is a Japanese former pole vaulter who competed in the 1984 Summer Olympics.

References

1956 births
Living people
Japanese male pole vaulters
Olympic athletes of Japan
Athletes (track and field) at the 1984 Summer Olympics
Sportspeople from Kagawa Prefecture
Asian Games medalists in athletics (track and field)
Athletes (track and field) at the 1978 Asian Games
Athletes (track and field) at the 1982 Asian Games
Asian Games gold medalists for Japan
Medalists at the 1978 Asian Games
Medalists at the 1982 Asian Games